is a Japanese actor and member of the acting troupe D-BOYS, produced by Watanabe Entertainment.

Biography
Usui joined D-BOYS through the 4th D-BOYS open audition, held on May 28, 2007. Winner of the audition's Grand Prix, Usui was officially added to the group on December 30, 2007, after making his entertainment debut on the TV Tokyo comedy series ChocoMimi.

Filmography

Television
 ChocoMimi (TV Tokyo, 2007)
Engine Sentai Go-onger as Hanto Jou/Go-on Green (TV Asahi, 2008)
 Misaki Number One as Ando Masahiro(NTV, 2011) 
 Blackboard ~Jidai to Tatakatta Kyōshi tachi~! Second Night (TBS, 2012)
 Sugarless as Kiryu Yoichiro / Kirio (NTV, 2012)
 GTO 2012 SP (2012)
 Saint Seiya Omega (2014) as Subaru/Saturn (Episode 93)
 Magical × Heroine Magimajo Pures! as Shigeru Akechi (TV Tokyo, 2018, episode 20)

Film
 Engine Sentai Go-onger: Boom Boom! Bang Bang! GekijōBang!! (2008 Toei) as Hanto Jou/Go-on Green
 GOTH (2008)
 Engine Sentai Go-onger vs. Gekiranger (2009 Toei) as Hanto Jou/Go-on Green
 Creepy Hide and Seek (2009)
 Samurai Sentai Shinkenger vs. Go-onger: GinmakuBang!! (2010 Toei) as Hanto Jou/Go-on Green
 Maria-sama ga Miteru as Suguru Kashiwagi (2010)
 Mahou Shoujo wo Wasurenai as Oda Naoki (2011)

References

External links
Usui's profile on Watanabe Entertainment
Usui's official blog

1991 births
Living people
21st-century Japanese male actors
Japanese male television actors
Japanese male film actors